The net protein utilization, or NPU, is the ratio of amino acid mass converted to proteins to the mass of amino acids supplied. This figure is somewhat affected by the salvage of essential amino acids within the body, but is profoundly affected by the level of limiting amino acids within a foodstuff.

It is used as a measure of "protein quality" for human nutritional purposes.

As a value, NPU can range from 0 to 1 (or 100), with a value of 1 (or 100) indicating 100% utilization of dietary nitrogen as protein and a value of 0 an indication that none of the nitrogen supplied was converted to protein.

Certain foodstuffs, such as eggs or milk, rate as 1 on an NPU chart.

Experimentally, this value can be determined by determining dietary protein intake and then measuring nitrogen excretion. One formula for NPU is:

NPU = {0.16 × (24 hour protein intake in grams)} - {(24 hour urinary urea nitrogen) + 2} - {0.1 × (ideal body weight in kilograms)} / {0.16 × (24 hour protein intake in grams)}

The Protein Digestibility Corrected Amino Acid Score (PDCAAS) is a more modern rating for determining protein quality, and the current ranking standard used by the FDA.

The Digestible Indispensable Amino Acid Score (DIAAS) is a protein quality method, proposed in March 2013 by the Food and Agriculture Organization to replace the current protein ranking standard, the Protein Digestibility Corrected Amino Acid Score (PDCAAS). The proposition is contested, however, due to conflicts of interest and lack of data.

See also
 Biological value
 Protein efficiency ratio
 Nitrogen balance

References

Suzanne Nelson et al. Ad Libitum. H2O NaC

Amino acids
Proteins
Nutrition